Gennes-Ivergny is a commune in the Pas-de-Calais department in the Hauts-de-France region of France.

Geography

Population

Places of interest
 The church of St.Louis, dating from the seventeenth century.
 The Commonwealth War Graves Commission cemetery.
 A sixteenth century manor house with a 5-sided tower.

See also
Communes of the Pas-de-Calais department

References

External links

 The CWGC burials in the churchyard

Gennesivergny